Istebné is a village and municipality in Dolný Kubín District in the Žilina Region of northern Slovakia.

See also
 List of municipalities and towns in Slovakia

References

Genealogical resources

The records for genealogical research are available at the state archive "Statny Archiv in Bytca, Slovakia"

 Lutheran church records (births/marriages/deaths): 1781-1933 (parish A)

External links
 Local Website in Slovakian
Surnames of living people in Istebne

Villages and municipalities in Dolný Kubín District